A biordered set (otherwise known as boset) is a mathematical object that occurs in the description of the structure of the set of idempotents in a semigroup.

The set of idempotents in a semigroup is a biordered set and every biordered set is the set of idempotents of some semigroup.
A regular biordered set is a biordered set with an additional  property. The set of idempotents in a regular semigroup is a regular biordered set, and  every  regular biordered set is the set of idempotents of some regular semigroup.

History 
The concept and the terminology were developed by K S S Nambooripad in the early 1970s.
In 2002, Patrick Jordan introduced the term boset as an abbreviation of biordered set. The defining properties of a biordered set are expressed in terms of two quasiorders defined on the set and hence the name biordered set.

According to Mohan S. Putcha, "The axioms defining a biordered set are quite complicated. However, considering the general nature of semigroups, it is rather surprising that such a finite axiomatization is even possible."  Since the publication of the original definition of the biordered set by Nambooripad, several variations in the definition have been proposed. David Easdown simplified the definition and formulated the axioms in a special arrow notation invented by him.

Definition

Preliminaries 

If X and Y are sets and ρ ⊆ X × Y, let ρ ( y ) = { x ∈ X : x ρ y }. 
  
Let E  be a set in which  a partial binary operation, indicated by juxtaposition, is defined.  If DE is the domain of the partial binary operation on E then DE is a relation on E and (e,f) is in  DE  if and only if the product ef exists in E. The following relations can be defined in E:

If T is any statement about E involving the partial binary operation and the above relations in E, one can define the left-right dual of T denoted by T*. If DE is symmetric then T* is meaningful whenever T is.

Formal definition 

The set E  is called a biordered set if the following axioms and their duals hold for arbitrary elements e, f, g, etc. in E.

(B1) ωr    and ωl  are reflexive and transitive relations on E and DE = ( ωr ∪ ω l ) ∪ ( ωr  ∪ ωl )−1.

(B21) If f is in ωr( e ) then f R fe  ω e.  

(B22) If g ωl f and if f and g are in ωr ( e ) then ge ωl fe.

(B31) If g ωr f and f ωr e then gf = ( ge )f.

(B32) If g ωl f and if f and g are in ωr ( e ) then ( fg )e = ( fe )( ge ).

In M ( e, f ) = ωl ( e ) ∩ ωr ( f ) (the M-set of e and f in that order), define a relation  by 

.  

Then the set

is called the sandwich set of e and f in that order. 

(B4) If f and g are in ωr ( e ) then S( f, g )e = S ( fe, ge ).

M-biordered sets and regular biordered sets 

We say that a biordered set E is an M''-biordered set if M ( e, f ) ≠ ∅ for all e and f in E.  
Also, E is called a  regular biordered set if S ( e, f ) ≠ ∅ for all e and f in E.

In 2012 Roman S. Gigoń gave a simple proof that M-biordered sets arise from E-inversive semigroups.

 Subobjects and morphisms 
 Biordered subsets 
A subset F  of a biordered set E  is a biordered subset (subboset) of E if F is a biordered set under the partial binary operation inherited from E. 

For any e in E the sets ωr ( e ),  ωl ( e ) and ω  ( e ) are biordered subsets of E.

 Bimorphisms 

A mapping φ : E → F between two biordered sets E and F is a biordered set  homomorphism (also called a bimorphism) if for all ( e, f ) in DE we have ( eφ ) ( fφ ) = ( ef )φ.

 Illustrative examples 
 Vector space example 

Let V be a vector space and E =  { ( A, B ) | V =  A  ⊕  B }

where V  = A  ⊕  B  means that A and B are subspaces of V and V is the  internal direct sum of A and B. 
The partial binary operation ⋆ on E defined by 

( A, B ) ⋆ ( C, D ) = ( A + ( B ∩ C ), ( B + C ) ∩ D ) 

makes E a biordered set. The quasiorders in E are characterised as follows: 

( A, B ) ωr ( C, D ) ⇔ A ⊇ C( A, B ) ωl ( C, D ) ⇔ B ⊆ D Biordered set of a semigroup 

The set E of idempotents in a semigroup S becomes a biordered set if a partial binary operation is defined in E as follows: ef is defined in E if and only if ef = e or ef= f or fe = e or fe = f holds in S. If S is a regular semigroup then E is a regular biordered set.

As a concrete example, let S be the semigroup of all mappings of X = { 1, 2, 3 } into itself. Let the symbol (abc) denote the map for which 1 → a,  2 → b, and 3 → c. The set E of idempotents in S contains the following elements:

(111), (222), (333)  (constant maps)

(122), (133), (121), (323), (113), (223)

(123) (identity map)

The following table (taking composition of mappings in the diagram order) describes the partial binary operation in E''. An X in a cell indicates that the corresponding multiplication is not defined.

References 

Semigroup theory
Algebraic structures
Mathematical structures